Hope Lodge is a charitable project run by the American Cancer Society (ACS) offering cancer patients and their caregivers a free place to stay when they are being treated in another location away from home. Patients staying at a Hope Lodge must be in active cancer treatment, and permanently reside more than 40 miles or one hour away from their cancer treatment center. Each patient must be accompanied by a caregiver.

Established in 1970, the Charleston, South Carolina Hope Lodge was the first facility to open. The concept came from Margot Freudenberg, a leader in the Charleston medical and business communities, who saw a similar facility while traveling through Australia and New Zealand with U.S. President Dwight D. Eisenhower's People to People Ambassador Program. ACS's Hope Lodge Network has expanded into more than thirty locations throughout the United States. There is also a Hope Lodge unit in Puerto Rico. Lodging and most services are offered free of charge.

References

External links
Cancer.org: Hope Lodge page
Hope Lodge guest orientation

American Cancer Society
Health charities in the United States